A submarine rescue ship is a surface support ship for submarine rescue and deep-sea salvage operations. Methods employed include the McCann Rescue Chamber, deep-submergence rescue vehicles (DSRV's) and diving operations.

List of active submarine rescue ships

Royal Australian Navy (DMS Maritime)

Brazilian Navy 
 NSS GUILOBEL (K12)

Chinese Navy 
 Dajiang class

Italian Navy 
 Italian ship Anteo (A5309)

Japan Maritime Self-Defense Force 
 JS Chihaya (ASR-403)
 JS Chiyoda (ASR-404)

Royal Malaysian Navy 
 MV Mega Bakti

Republic of Singapore Navy 
MV Swift Rescue

South Korean Navy 
 ROKS Cheonghaejin (ASR 21)

Spanish Navy 

 Neptuno (A-20) (to be replaced in 2024 by the BAM-IS 45)

Royal Swedish Navy 
 HSwMS Belos (A214)

Turkish Navy 
 TCG Alemdar (A-582)

Vietnam People's Navy 
 Yết Kiêu (927)

List of decommissioned submarine rescue ships

Japan Maritime Self-Defense Force 
 JDS Chihaya (ASR-401) (Retired)
 JDS Fushimi (ASR-402) (Retired)
 JS Chiyoda (AS-405) (Retired)

Spanish Navy 
 Kanguro (Retired in 1943)
 Poseidón (A-12) (Ceded to Mauritania in 2000. Sunk in 2011)

United States Navy 
 USS Widgeon (ASR-1)
 USS Falcon (ASR-2)
 USS Chewink (ASR-3)
 USS Mallard (ASR-4)
 USS Ortolan (ASR-5)
 USS Pigeon (ASR-6)
 USS Chanticleer (ASR-7)
 USS Coucal (ASR-8)
 USS Florikan (ASR-9)
 USS Greenlet (ASR-10)
 USS Macaw (ASR-11)
 USS Penguin (ASR–12)
 USS Kittiwake (ASR-13)
 USS Petrel (ASR-14)
 USS Sunbird (ASR-15)
 USS Tringa (ASR-16)
 USS Verdin (ASR-17) - cancelled in 1945 
 USS Windhover (ASR-18) - cancelled in 1945 
 USS Bluebird (ASR-19)
 USS Skylark (ASR-20) 
 USS Pigeon (ASR-21)
 USS Ortolan (ASR-22)

See also

Mystic-class deep submergence rescue vehicle

References

Ship types
Auxiliary ships